Nilanka Rukshitha (born 29 August 1998) is a Sri Lankan cricketer. He made his Twenty20 debut for Galle Cricket Club in the 2017–18 SLC Twenty20 Tournament on 25 February 2018. He made his List A debut for Galle Cricket Club in the 2017–18 Premier Limited Overs Tournament on 10 March 2018.

References

External links
 

1998 births
Living people
Sri Lankan cricketers
Galle Cricket Club cricketers
Place of birth missing (living people)